The Fetz-Keller Ranch Headquarters, in Montrose County, Colorado near Montrose, Colorado, was listed on the National Register of Historic Places in 2019.

It was at its peak probably in the 1910s and 1920s.

It includes six contributing buildings and six contributing structures.

The main house, built around 1888, is a two-story  cross-gable wood-framed building, facing but well set back from Highway 90.

It was designated a Montrose County Historical Landmark on October 24, 2018.

References

National Register of Historic Places in Montrose County, Colorado
Buildings and structures completed in 1888
Historic districts on the National Register of Historic Places in Colorado